This is a list of protected areas of the Northwest Territories.

National parks
 Aulavik National Park 
 Nahanni National Park Reserve 
 Naats'ihch'oh National Park Reserve 
 Pingo Canadian Landmark
Thaidene Nëné National Park Reserve
 Tuktut Nogait National Park 
 Wood Buffalo National Park (In Alberta also)

Territorial parks

Dehcho Region 
 Blackstone Territorial Park
 Dory Point Territorial Park
 Fort Providence Territorial Park
 Fort Simpson Territorial Park
 Sambaa Deh Falls Territorial Park

Inuvik Region 
 Gwich’in Territorial Park
 Happy Valley Territorial Park
 Ja’k Territorial Park
 Nitainlaii Territorial Park

North Slave Region 
 Cameron River Crossing Territorial Park
 Chan Lake Territorial Park
 Fred Henne Territorial Park
 Hidden Lake Territorial Park
 Madeline Lake Territorial Park
 North Arm Territorial Park
 Pontoon Lake Territorial Park
 Powder Point Territorial Park
 Prelude Lake Territorial Park
 Prosperous Lake Territorial Park
 Reid Lake Territorial Park
 Yellowknife River Territorial Park

Sahtu Region 

 McKinnon Territorial Park

South Slave Region 
 60th Parallel Territorial Park
 Fort Smith Mission Territorial Park
 Hay River Territorial Park
 Kakisa River Territorial Park
 Lady Evelyn Falls Territorial Park
 Little Buffalo River Crossing Territorial Park
 Little Buffalo River Falls Territorial Park
 McNallie Creek Territorial Park
 Queen Elizabeth Territorial Park
 Twin Falls Gorge Territorial Park

Indigenous Protected and Conserved Areas

Dehcho Region 

 Edéhzhíe Protected Area

Other
Thelon Wildlife Sanctuary

See also
List of Canadian provincial parks
List of National Parks of Canada

External links
Government of Northwest Territories - Northwest Territories Parks

Northwest Territories
Protected